Alvin J. Quackenbush (June 20, 1852 – January 6, 1921) was an American merchant and politician from New York.

Life 
Quackenbush was born on June 20, 1852 in Guilderland, New York. He attended Albany Business College.

After working on a farm and working in his father's wholesale commission office in Albany, Quackenbush moved to Fuller's Station and worked in the hay business. Five years later, he moved to Schenectady and continued the hay business. In 1889, he became the eastern agent of Anheuser-Busch. He also owned a 200 acre farm in Saratoga County, near Ballston. He served as alderman for several terms, and was commissioner of public works.

In 1890, Quackenbush was elected to the New York State Assembly as a Democrat, representing Schenectady County. He served in the Assembly in 1891, 1892, and 1893. He was a delegate to the 1892 Democratic National Convention.

Quackenbush married Amelia Van Wie; they had a daughter, Olive.

Death
Quackenbush died of blood poisoning on January 6, 1921, aged 68. He was buried in Prospect Hill Cemetery in Guilderland.

References

External links
The Political Graveyard
Alvin J. Quackenbush at Find a Grave

1852 births
1921 deaths
People from Guilderland, New York
Businesspeople from Schenectady, New York
Schenectady City Council members
Democratic Party members of the New York State Assembly
19th-century American politicians
Deaths from sepsis
Burials in New York (state)
Albany Business College alumni